Admiral Barry may refer to:

Claud Barry (1891–1951), British Royal Navy admiral
Henry Deacon Barry (1849–1908), British Royal Navy vice admiral

See also
John Barry (naval officer) (1745–1803), U.S. Navy commodore, equivalent rank in use at the time